Krężoły may refer to the following places:
Krężoły, Greater Poland Voivodeship (west-central Poland)
Krężoły, Kuyavian-Pomeranian Voivodeship (north-central Poland)
Krężoły, Świętokrzyskie Voivodeship (south-central Poland)
Krężoły, Lubusz Voivodeship (west Poland)